Ampaire is an American aircraft manufacturer startup based in Hawthorne, California.

History 

The company developed the Electric EEL, based on a Cessna 337 Skymaster (a push-pull aircraft) with a piston engine replaced by an electric motor powered by a battery, in a parallel hybrid configuration. The demonstrator first flew on 6 June 2019.

In 2020, Scottish regional carrier Loganair trialled the Electric EEL with 70% fuel savings for short hops and 50% for longer flights of 50-250 miles (80-400 km).
In February 2021, online booking platform Surf Air Mobility attempted to acquire Ampaire, but this was abandoned by April 2022.
By then, ground tests of its Eco Caravan, a hybrid-electric Grand Caravan, were under way, towards a first flight in the second half of 2022 and service entry in 2024, as a retrofit with a STC.

The parallel hybrid architecture does not require recharging after each flight, to avoid being dependent on charging infrastructure. Ampaire is considering for 2025 or 2026 a 19-passenger Eco Otter SX based on the De Havilland Canada DHC-6 Twin Otter with four motors instead of two turboprops. Ampaire next step would be a Dash 8 or ATR type, and ultimately a clean-sheet Tailwind with a propulsive ducted fan for boundary-layer ingestion.

References

External links

Aircraft manufacturers of the United States
Electric aircraft
Hybrid electric aircraft